Brothers Voitka are Ülo Voitka (born 7 October 1968) and Aivar Voitka (born 17 March 1967). They were Estonian Forest Brothers 1986–2000. 27 March 1986 the brothers became forest brothers, when they fled with Aavo Voitka and Aivar Votika from soviet recruitment.  Aavo Voitka and Aivar Voitka were eventually caught and punished, but Ülo and Aivar managed to continue their hiding till the year 2000, 9 years after the Estonian restoration of Independence. They were spotted and reported to the authorities by a local who saw them. When the police surrounded the brothers, the brothers opened fire in the direction of police, but did not hit anyone. K-kommando was brought, and through negotiation, the brothers surrendered. The punishment of brothers was controversial.

They are arguably the last forest brothers.

Book about brothers Voitka
 Ülo Russak, "Ilveste impeerium" ("The Empire of the Lynxes"; 2001)

Film about brothers Voitka
 "V. O. I. T. K. A. metsavennad" ("V. O. I. T. K. A. Forest Brothers"; dir. Pekka Lehto; 2004)

References

External links
 Brothers Voitka
 Brothers Voitka (images)

1968 births
Living people
1967 births